"Start the Fire" is Tarkan's second English language single from the album Come Closer, released in 2006.

CD Releases
 Start the Fire, 2006
 Start The Fire (Original Version)
 Start The Fire (Mousse T. Radio Mix)
 Start The Fire (Mousse T. Radio Instrumental)
 Start The Fire (Bugati Remix)
 Start the Fire (Bugati Remix Instrumental)
 Start the Fire (Bugati Remix Acapella)
 Start the Fire (Fat Tony Crew vs Eniac Remix)
 Start the Fire (Fat Tony Crew vs Eniac Dub Remix)
 Start the Fire (Mousse T Abi's Club Mix)
 Start The Fire (Mousse T Abi's Club Mix Instrumental)

Charts

References

External links
 Tarkan.com
 Juno Records

2006 singles
Tarkan (singer) songs
Songs written by Tarkan (singer)
Song recordings produced by Brian Kierulf
Songs written by Brian Kierulf
Songs written by Josh Schwartz
Song recordings produced by Josh Schwartz
English-language Turkish songs